Kruskal may refer to any of the following, of whom the first three are brothers:

 William Kruskal (1919–2005), American mathematician and statistician
 Martin David Kruskal (1925–2006), American mathematician and physicist
 Joseph Kruskal (1928–2010), American mathematician, statistician and computer scientist, known for Kruskal's algorithm
 Clyde Kruskal (born 1954), American computer scientist, son of Martin